Stephen Carroll is a Canadian rock guitarist, and a member of the indie rock band The Weakerthans. Originally a member of the punk rock band Painted Thin, he appeared as a guest musician on the first Weakerthans album, Fallow, and became a permanent member after Painted Thin broke up.

He also appeared as a guest musician on Greg Graffin's solo album Cold as the Clay, along with bandmates Jason Tait and Greg Smith.

Alongside Brandon Reid (The National), Carroll co-produced The Details' full-length album Lost Art, a pair of songs on The Details' The Original Mark EP, which he also plays on. He was also featured on their 2007 release, Draw a Distance. Draw a Border.

References

External links
 CBC Arts interview with Stephen Carroll 

Year of birth missing (living people)
Place of birth missing (living people)
Living people
Folk punk musicians
Canadian rock guitarists
Canadian male guitarists
Canadian indie rock musicians
Musicians from Winnipeg
The Weakerthans members